Haapasalo is a Finnish surname. Notable people with the surname include:

 Alli Haapasalo (born 1977), Finnish filmmaker
 Kreeta Haapasalo (1813–1893), Finnish musician
 Mimmi Haapasalo (1881–1970), Finnish salesperson and politician
 Ville Haapasalo (born 1972), Finnish actor

Finnish-language surnames